Tahir Zemaj (28 December 1952 – 4 January 2003) born in Strellc region, Gjakova, SFR Yugoslavia (now Kosovo) was an officer in the Yugoslav People's Army, Commander in Chief of the Armed Forces of the Republic of Kosova (FARK) and general of the Kosovo Liberation Army (KLA) during the Kosovo War (1998–1999). 

On 4 January 2003, he was murdered along with his son and cousin in the city of Peja.

References

Note

1956 births
2003 deaths
Kosovan soldiers
Kosovan murder victims
People murdered in Kosovo
People murdered in Serbia
People murdered in Yugoslavia
Military personnel from Gjakova
20th-century Albanian military personnel
20th-century Albanian people
Kosovo Liberation Army soldiers
Kosovo Albanians
2003 crimes in Kosovo
2000s murders in Kosovo
2003 murders in Serbia